Ontario was a provincial riding in the Canadian province of Ontario. Called Ontario South until 1933, it was active from 1867 to 1975. For its entire existence, the riding contained parts of or all of Ontario County, a now-defunct county which comprised most, but not all, of the contemporary Regional Municipality of Durham, including the municipalities of Ajax, Oshawa, Pickering and Whitby. After 1955, however, a separate riding called Oshawa was created to serve the city of Oshawa, Ajax and parts of Pickering and Whitby, while the Ontario riding continued to serve the more rural areas in the county. In 1966 a new Ontario South was created to represent Ajax, Pickering and Whitby. The remainder of the riding was divided into the new ridings of Durham West, Durham East and Durham—York in 1975.

Members of the Legislative Assembly

Election results (1934-1963)

References
Centennial Edition of a History of the Electoral Districts, Legislatures and Ministries of the Province of Ontario 1867-1967

Former provincial electoral districts of Ontario
Ajax, Ontario
Pickering, Ontario
Politics of Oshawa
Whitby, Ontario